The Kemayan railway station is a Malaysian train station stationed at and named after the town of Kemayan, Bera District, Pahang.

Train services
 Ekspres Rakyat Timuran 26/27 Tumpat–JB Sentral
 Ekspres Makmur 34/35 Kuala Lipis–Gemas

References

External links
 Kemayan KTM Railway Station

Bera District
KTM East Coast Line stations
Railway stations in Pahang